Led Zeppelin's 1970 European Tour was a concert tour of Europe by the English rock band. The tour commenced on 23 February and concluded on 12 March 1970.

Overview
During this tour, the cover for the band's debut album met with controversy. At a 28 February 1970 performance in Copenhagen, the band was billed as "The Nobs" as the result of a threat of legal action from aristocrat Frau Eva von Zeppelin, descendant of Count Ferdinand von Zeppelin creator of the Zeppelin aircraft, over use of the 'Zeppelin' name. Led Zeppelin guitarist Jimmy Page commented to the music newspaper Melody Maker that Frau Eva von Zeppelin initially took issue during an early Led Zeppelin concert performance in Copenhagen in October 1969, when she tried (unsuccessfully) to stop a television appearance.  The aristocrat angrily described the group as "shrieking monkeys".

As a gesture of good will, the band invited her to meet with them at a television studio.  The meeting was apparently a cordial one. However, upon leaving the studio, her anger reignited when she saw the cover of the group's first album – the exploding Hindenburg aircraft. As Page recalled:

Frau von Zeppelin felt the band's use of Zeppelin was insulting and dishonoured her family name. As a result, hostility toward the rock group continued on their next tour of the country in early 1970 by threat of a lawsuit, unless they agreed to change their name while working there. While Peter Grant (the band's manager) was not normally passive when faced with a confrontation, it was decided to appease the aristocrat by temporarily changing the group's name.

One name speculated in the national press was "Ned Zeppelin", which Jimmy Page found humorous.  After some discussion, Grant and Page settled on the tongue-in-cheek name The Nobs, a playful pun on the name of their European promoter, Claude Nobs.

The controversy in Copenhagen was considered advantageous to Led Zeppelin early in their career, as the incident gained them worldwide publicity. The band's choice of names was widely seen as an expression of the band's likability and wit.

One concert from this tour, at Frankfurt on 10 March, was cancelled at a week's notice as a result of riots having previously occurred at the venue following a concert by Jethro Tull. It was replaced by a gig at Hamburg.

Tour set list
The fairly typical set list for the tour was:

"We're Gonna Groove" (Ben E. King)
"I Can't Quit You Baby" (Dixon)
"Dazed and Confused" (Page)
"Heartbreaker" (Bonham, Page, Plant)
"White Summer"/"Black Mountain Side" (Page)
"Since I've Been Loving You" (Page, Plant, Jones)
"Thank You" (Page, Plant)
"What Is and What Should Never Be" (Page, Plant) (On 7 March, 10 March, and 11 March)
"Moby Dick" (Bonham)
"How Many More Times" (Bonham, Jones, Page)

Encores (variations of the following list):
"Communication Breakdown" (Bonham, Jones, Page)
"Whole Lotta Love" (Bonham, Dixon, Jones, Page, Plant)
"Bring It On Home" (Dixon, Page, Plant) (On 28 February)
"C'mon Everybody"/"Something Else" (Cochran, Capehart, Sheeley, Cochran) (On 28 February)
"Long Tall Sally" (Little Richard) (On 28 February)

There were some set list substitutions, variations, and order switches during the tour.

Tour dates

Sources
Lewis, Dave and Pallett, Simon (1997) Led Zeppelin: The Concert File, London: Omnibus Press. .

References

External links
Video footage of Led Zeppelin in Germany, 1970 (official website)
Comprehensive archive of known concert appearances by Led Zeppelin (official website)
Led Zeppelin concert setlists

Led Zeppelin concert tours
1970 concert tours
LZ 129 Hindenburg
1970 in Europe
February 1970 events in Europe
March 1970 events in Europe